Dvigatel' Revolyutsii is a  station on the Avtozavodskaya line of the Nizhny Novgorod Metro. It opened on 20 November 1985 as one of the six original stations of the Metro.

It is in the Ippodromny section of Leninsky District of Nizhny Novgorod. The name Dvigatel’ Revolyutsii means “Engine of the Revolution” in Russian and comes from the Soviet-era name of the nearby diesel engine factory. The station retained its name although the factory was renamed RUMO in 1993.

Incidents 
On 16 June 2014, the station sustained a flood after a nearby water main burst. Service was restored after several hours and there were no reported injuries.

References

External links 
Station page on official Metro website
 

Nizhny Novgorod Metro stations
Railway stations in Russia opened in 1985
1985 establishments in the Soviet Union
Railway stations located underground in Russia